The Guerilla Band is an album by American pianist Hal Galper released on the Mainstream label in 1971.

Critical reception

The Allmusic review by Jim Todd states "While not one of the classics of the jazz fusion movement of the early '70s, The Guerilla Band does attempt to say something substantial and avoids the genre's commercial pitfalls ... Galper writes long, impressionistic lines that are played over busy, skittering, rhythms – imagine Miles Davis's In a Silent Way merged with a funky, Isley Brothers' track ... this band produces a distinctive brand of jazz fusion that deserves a place in any thorough documentation of the genre's short-lived, peak creative year".

Track listing
All compositions by Hal Galper unless noted.
 "Call" - 6:05
 "Figure Eight" - 7:37
 "Black Night" - 3:16
 "Welcome to My Dreams" (Jimmy Van Heusen, Johnny Burke) - 4:50
 "Rise and Fall" - 9:05
 "Point of View" - 5:49

Personnel
Hal Galper - electric piano
Randy Brecker - trumpet, electric trumpet, flugelhorn
Michael Brecker - tenor saxophone, soprano saxophone
Bob Mann - electric guitar
Victor Gaskin - electric bass
Charles Alias - drums
Steve Haas - drums

References

Mainstream Records albums
Hal Galper albums
1971 albums
Albums produced by Bob Shad